Skrzynica  (formerly German Krinitze) is a village in the administrative district of Gmina Skwierzyna, within Międzyrzecz County, Lubusz Voivodeship, in western Poland.

The village has a population of 50.

References

Skrzynica